is a passenger railway station of West Japan Railway Company (JR-West) located in the city of Kameyama, Mie Prefecture, Japan.

Lines
Seki Station is served by the Kansai Main Line and is located 65.6 rail kilometres from the terminus of the line at Nagoya Station and 5.7 rail kilometers from Kameyama Station.

Layout
The station consists of two side platforms serving two tracks, connected by a footbridge.

Platforms

History
Seki Station was opened on December 25, 1890 with the extension of the Kansai Railway from Yokkaichi Station to Tsuge Station. The Kansai Railway was nationalized on October 1, 1907, becoming part of the Imperial Government Railways (IGR), which became Japan National Railways (JNR) after World War II. Freight operations were discontinued from April 1, 1972. With the privatization of JNR on April 1, 1987, the station came under the control of JR-West.

Passenger statistics
In fiscal 2019, the station was used by an average of 434 passengers daily (boarding passengers only).

Surrounding area
Seki-juku (Tōkaidō) 
former Seki Town Hall

See also
 List of railway stations in Japan

References

External links

  

Railway stations in Japan opened in 1890
Railway stations in Mie Prefecture
Kameyama, Mie